Anipireddi Venkata Praveen Kumar Reddy is an Indian politician and a former MLA from Thamballapalle in Chittoor district in Andhra Pradesh.

Career
He was first elected to the Andhra Pradesh Legislative Assembly in 2009. He was elected to the Assembly on TDP, but is joining YSR Congress Party.

References

Members of the Andhra Pradesh Legislative Assembly
Year of birth missing (living people)
Living people
People from Chittoor district
Telugu Desam Party politicians
YSR Congress Party politicians